Konstantin Lokhanov (born 10 November 1998) is a Russian fencer. He competed in the 2020 Summer Olympics.

He is a two-time (2014 and 2015) world cadet sabre champion, and a two-time (2017 and 2018) world junior sabre champion.

Personal life

Since September 2020, Lokhanov is married to fencer Sofia Pozdniakova. His father in law Stanislav Pozdniakov won four Olympic fencing gold medals.

He studied at the Saratov State Academy of Law.

References

1998 births
Living people
Sportspeople from Moscow
People from Aktobe
Fencers at the 2020 Summer Olympics
Russian male fencers
Olympic fencers of Russia
21st-century Russian people